Boguchany Aluminium Smelter (Boguchanskiy Alyuminiyevy Zavod) is a Russian aluminium smelter currently being constructed near the settlement of Tayozhny, in the Boguchansky District of Krasnoyarsk Krai. It is one of the largest development projects of the RUSAL company, which is building this new aluminium plant in partnership with hydroelectricity producer RusHydro.

The project capacity of the plant is 600,000 tons of aluminium per year. Total investment in the project is estimated to reach $2 billion. Over 1500 workers will work at the main production facility, while another 1500 jobs will be created in the supporting facilities. The smelter was scheduled to be launched in 2013.

References

External links 
 Boguchany Aluminium Smelter at the RUSAL official site 

Buildings and structures in Krasnoyarsk Krai
Rusal
Companies based in Krasnoyarsk Krai
Aluminium smelters